Manjaro is a free and open-source Linux distribution based on the Arch Linux operating system that has a focus on user-friendliness and accessibility. It uses a rolling release update model and Pacman as its package manager. It is developed mainly in Austria, France and Germany.

History
Manjaro was first released on July 10, 2011. By mid 2013, Manjaro was in the beta stage, though key elements of the final system had all been implemented such as: a GUI installer (then an Antergos installer fork); a package manager (Pacman) with its choice of frontends; Pamac (GTK) for Xfce desktop and Octopi (Qt) for its Openbox edition; MHWD (Manjaro Hardware Detection, for detection of free & proprietary video drivers); and Manjaro Settings Manager (for system-wide settings, user management, and graphics driver installation and management).

GNOME Shell support was dropped with the release of version 0.8.3 in 2012. However, efforts within Arch Linux made it possible to restart the Cinnamon/GNOME edition as a community edition. An official release offering the GNOME desktop environment was reinstated in March 2017.

During the development of Manjaro 0.9.0 at the end of August 2015, the Manjaro team decided to switch to year and month designations for the Manjaro version scheme instead of numbers. This applies to both the 0.8.x series as well as the new 0.9.x series, renaming 0.8.13, released in June 2015, as 15.06 and so on. Manjaro 15.09, codenamed Bellatrix and formerly known as 0.9.0, was released on 27 September 2015 with the new Calamares installer and updated packages.

In September 2017, Manjaro announced that support for i686 architecture would be dropped because "popularity of this architecture is decreasing". However, in November 2017 a semi-official community project "manjaro32", based on archlinux32, continued i686 support.

In September 2019, the Manjaro GmbH & Co. KG company was founded. It's FOSS website stated the company was formed '... to effectively engage in commercial agreements, form partnerships, and offer professional services'.

Official editions
Manjaro Xfce, featuring Manjaro's own dark theme and the Xfce desktop.

Manjaro KDE, featuring Manjaro's own dark Plasma theme and the latest KDE Plasma 5, apps and frameworks.

Manjaro GNOME became the third official version with the Gellivara release; it offers the GNOME desktop with a version of the Manjaro theme.

While not official releases, Manjaro Community Editions are maintained by members of the Manjaro community. They offer additional user interfaces over the official releases, including Budgie, Cinnamon, Deepin, i3, MATE, and Sway.

Manjaro also has editions for devices with ARM processors, such as single-board computers or Pinebook notebooks.

Features
Manjaro comes with both a CLI and a graphical installer. The rolling release model means that users do not need to upgrade/reinstall the whole system to keep it all up-to-date inline with the latest release. Package management is handled by Pacman via the command line (terminal) and via front-end GUI package manager tools like the pre-installed Pamac. It can be configured as either a stable system (default) or bleeding edge, in line with Arch.

The repositories are managed with their own tool, BoxIt, which is designed like Git.

Manjaro includes its own GUI settings manager where options like language, drivers, and kernel version can be configured.

Certain commonly used Arch utilities, such as the Arch Build System (ABS), are available but have alternate implementations in Manjaro.

Manjaro Architect is a CLI net installer that allows users to choose their own kernel versions, drivers, and desktop environments during the install process. Both the official and the community edition's desktop environments are available for selection. For GUI-based installations, Manjaro uses the GUI installer Calamares.

Release history
The 0.8.x series releases were the last versions of Manjaro to use a version number. The desktop environments offered, as well as the number of programs bundled into each separate release, have varied in different releases.

Manjaro typically includes the latest versions of supported desktop environments.

Relation to Arch Linux
The main difference compared to Arch Linux is the repositories.

Manjaro uses three sets of repositories:

 Unstable: contains the most up to date Arch Linux packages. Unstable is synced several times a day with Arch package releases.
 Testing: contains packages from the unstable repositories after they have been tested by users.
 Stable: contains only packages that are deemed stable by the development team, which can mean a delay of a few weeks before getting major upgrades.

, package updates derived from the Arch Linux stable branch to the Manjaro stable branch typically have a lag of a few weeks.

Derivatives
Netrunner Rolling, in addition to Blue Systems Netrunner, which is Debian-based. The first version of Netrunner Rolling was 2014.04, which was based on Manjaro 0.8.9 KDE. It was released in 2014. The last released version was Netrunner Rolling 2019.04.

The Sonar GNU/Linux project was aimed at providing a barrier-free Linux to people who required assistive technology for computer use, with support for GNOME and MATE desktop. The first version was released in February 2015, the latest release was in 2016. As of 2017, the Sonar project was discontinued.

Hardware 

Although Manjaro can be installed on most systems, some vendors sell computers with Manjaro pre-installed on them. Suppliers of computers pre-installed with Manjaro include StarLabs Systems, Tuxedo Computers, manjarocomputer.eu and Pine64.

Manjaro with Plasma Mobile desktop environment is the default operating system on PinePhone, an ARM-based smartphone released by Pine64.

Reception
Over the years, Manjaro Linux was recognized as a desktop easy to set up and use, suitable for both beginners and experienced users. It is recommended as an easy and friendly way to install and maintain a cutting-edge Arch-derived distribution. Some reviewers find appeal in the large range of contributed software available in the AUR, which has a reputation for being kept up to date from upstream resources. Others highlight the wide selection of official and community editions with different desktop environments.

Very early versions of Manjaro had a reputation for crashing and for installation difficulties, but this was reported to have improved with later versions, and by 2014 was, according to Jesse Smith of DistroWatch, "proving to be probably the most polished child of Arch Linux I have used to date. The distribution is not only easy to set up, but it has a friendly feel, complete with a nice graphical package manager, quality system installer and helpful welcome screen. Manjaro comes with lots of useful software and multimedia support."

Smith did a review of Manjaro 17.0.2 Xfce in July 2017, and observed that it did "a lot of things well". He went on to extol some of the notable features as part of his conclusion:

Notes

References

External links

 
 
 

2011 software
Arch-based Linux distributions
ARM Linux distributions
KDE
Linux distributions
Live USB
Operating system distributions bootable from read-only media
Pacman-based Linux distributions
Rolling Release Linux distributions
X86-64 Linux distributions